Pierre Paul Jeanpierre (14 March 1912 – 29 May 1958) was a senior officer of the Foreign Legion.

He initially served in the French Army and fought during World War II, the First Indochina War, the Suez Crisis and the Algerian War, where he was killed in action. Apart from a short time spent in the French resistance and as a deportee during World War II, he served with the Foreign Legion from 1936. Jeanpierre commanded the 1st Foreign Parachute Battalion, expanded into the 1st Foreign Parachute Regiment (1er REP) until his death during the Algerian War.

Early life 

Jeanpierre was born in 1912 at Belfort. His father was an active duty career officer and captain in the 42nd Infantry Regiment, killed during World War I in 1916 at Marne without ever seeing his family since the outbreak of the war in August 1914. Pierre was raised by the paternal sight of his mother and enlisted in the infantry at barely 18 years of age.

Military career

Prior to World War II 
Pierre enlisted in the 131st Infantry Regiment as a soldier in 1930 and worked being seconded from the enlisted corps by passing by all the non-commissioned ranks, graduating second from the Infantry and Tank School of Saint-Maixent as a Second-Lieutenant on 1 October 1936. Pierre's accomplished graduation ranking allowed him to choose the Foreign Legion's 1st Foreign Regiment, making a Legion Lieutenant on 1 October 1938.

World War II

Phoney War & Battle of France 

Pierre endured the Phoney War "Drôle de Guerre" and was put at disposition. He was also deeply marked by the defeat of 1940.

Syria–Lebanon Campaign

During World War II, Pierre also served with distinction in the Syria–Lebanon Campaign 6th Foreign Infantry Regiment, deployed in 1939 to the French Levant and took part in Mediterranean operations in 1940 at the corps formation of the 6th Foreign Infantry Regiment, part of the Foreign Legion Group. Following combats in the Syria–Lebanon Campaign which he did not partake in confronting other French contingents, Pierre refused to join the Free French Forces from the principle of sticking with his idea of a Tricolour Flag.

Resistance and deportation

Pierre joined instead the French Resistance under the alias "Jardin" and integrated the ranks of the movement  Ceux de la Libération; recruiting and arming over 60 volunteers; (those of the liberation). Pierre was arrested at Orléans on 19 January 1944 and was deported to as a prisoner interred in the Mauthausen-Gusen concentration camp after passing by the grouping camp of de Compiègne. With forced labor, Pierre would be among only 2 survivors out 45 in his stalag when the camp was liberated by the Allies on 5 May 1945. Liberated and healed, Pierre was nominated as a Captain at the center of recruitment of the Legion in Kehl. In July 1948, learning that in Algeria would be created a foreign parachute battalion, he volunteered, rejoined Sidi Bel Abbès then Philippeville where he was brevetted as a legion paratrooper. 3 month later, the battalion was in the high region of Indochina.

Indochina 

 1er Bataillon Etranger de Parachutiste, 1er BEP (1 July 1948 – 1 September 1955) - I,II,III Formations - 

Pierre sailed to Indochina as second-in-command to Pierre Segrétain in the (1er BEP, I Formation) of the 1st Foreign Parachute Battalion (1er BEP) in 1948. During the evacuation of RC 4, route de sang , he and the battalion jumped over That Khe in a traditional Foreign Legion battlefield while facing an enemy 20 times superior in numbers. Jeanpierre, owing to his energy, his savoir-faire around the terrain and his qualities of a combatant chief, managed to repel waves of incessant hellish ambushes by inheriting over much of the leadership of the battalion after Segrétain was killed leading the battalion. In October 1950, tasked with taking Dong Khé during the disaster of Cao Bang, the mission was to save column "Charton" which was unfolding. Hardly short of audacity, he held the line until the last, divided the survivors into small groups and reled the charge of 23 legionnaires, 3 sous-officiers, 2 officers to That Khé where a French garrison should still hold standing. From the hundreds of legionnaires that constituted the 1st Foreign Parachute Battalion (1er BEP, I Formation), only 12 men remained almost capable still. Commandant Segrétain was killed during combat at arms and Lieutenant Faulque fell pierced with projectiles, none of which were mortal. Seriously wounded, he was made prisoner and liberated 4 years later; he would be part of the troop of the living-dead which the Viet Minh would give back to France. the 1st Foreign Parachute Battalion (1e BEP, I Formation) with the 3rd Foreign Infantry Regiment were annihilated in Coxa. Following, Pierre rejoined the Legion in Mascara where he retook his passion, the instruction and forming of les jeunes legionnaires. The 1er BEP was recreated (1er BEP, II Formation); however, the last combats in Indochina would take place without his leadership. A Para legionnaire's legionnaire, Pierre returned to Indochina to command the (1er BEP, II Formation) of the reconstituted 1st Foreign Parachute Battalion (1er BEP, II Formation) after its second annihilation at the Battle of Dien Bien Phu. Reconstituted in a (1er BEP, III Formation) on 19 May 1954; Pierre took command of the 3rd reconstituted 1e BEP (III Formation) on 1 November 1954, the day on which the Algerian War commenced. The 1er BEP (III Formation) left Indochina on 8 February 1955. The 1er BEP totaled 5 citations at the orders of the armed forces and the fourragère of the colors of the Médaille militaire. The 1er BEP became the 1st Foreign Parachute Regiment (1er REP) in Algeria on 1 September 1955.

Suez Crisis

After the 1st Foreign Parachute Battalion 1e BEP became the 1st Foreign Parachute Regiment 1e REP, Pierre was passed over for command on 6 February 1956, instead serving as second-in-command, this time to Colonel Albert Brothier which he assumed but was deeply disappointed. The regiment was put on alert on 1 August 1956 after the preparation of the campaign in Egypt; Pierre embarked on October 31, however, his views and reservations of this disembarking were well known. a new mission was confined to Pierre, which was to end in the insurgency in Algeria, a police mission which no one wanted or liked but a mission which had to be executed successfully. Pierre retook command of the 1st Foreign Parachute Regiment in March 1957.

Algeria 

1er Regiment Etranger de Parachutiste, 1er REP (1 September 1955 – 30 April 1961)
  
Pierre reassumed command as the regimental commander following the leave of Colonel Brothier at command headquarters of the 10th Parachute Division commanded by Brigadier General Jacques Massu. Partnering operations with Pierre, was the 9th Parachute Chasseur Regiment 9ème RCP commanded by regimental commander colonel Buchond. This new mission was complicated and implied certain techniques of clandestine counter-insurgency operations, which several legion officers and a couple of legion sous-officiers were given authorization to complete. These techniques often featured torture.

The 1st Foreign Parachute Regiment won fame and success for security operations against the insurgents during the battle of Algiers, although his leg was badly wounded by a grenade launched by Saadi Yacef. Despite this, Jeanpierre wanted to pursue operations in the Atlas Mountains. Consequently, he adopted helicopters which would allow him to be present anywhere while surveilling all operations and leading assaults from the ground. His stationary code radio name was " Soleil" (The Sun).

He operated in the Sahara for some time. On 19 January 1958 the 1st Foreign Parachute Regiment left the Sahara after defeating ALN guerillas who wanted to compromise the security routes of oil convoys. Following him securing the petrol routes in the Sahara, combat operations engaged the regiment in the region of Guelma during the Battle of the borders. Pierre lead para assaults from the air and ground. On 24 January, 75 rebels were put outside of combat, and 6 heavy machine guns were stripped from then. Until March 1 and during 3 months, 1300 arms out of which 120 automatic machine guns were stripped from militants whom lost considerable influence over the region of Guelma.

Pierre had at his command not only his regiment but also support units and troop unit sectors that could be available for him. At his disposition were several helicopters out of which "Alouette" was the main one he used. Pierre was all over the air, as he permanently hovered above his companies. Launching his ideas, Pierre successfully applied putting into motion various tactics such as night operations, artillery support, heavy helicopter transport, aerial observations and aerial bombardments.

Pierre privileged intelligence, speed and surprise to apprehend an adversary with no escape. Pierre's most difficult idea: launch the assault by close range corps-a-corps combat, the essential role of the infantry and choc troops. Pierre Paul Jeanpierre lead the usual example in the field amongst his legionnaires and also slept sitting on the terrain, retaking habits adopted in Indochina. On 13 May 1958 Pierre was conducting and focusing on tasked operations while events stirred up in Algeria with the May 1958 crisis, he considered his mission unchanged. Accordingly, the regiment made way towards the mountains and canyons. While providing mobile leadership from the air followed by ground assaults, recon, intel, and direction to his combat companies from the "Alouette" in which he was hovering close to a little mountain. He was at the time pursuing several ALN militants. While commanding his troops, a shot striked Jeanpierre against the pilot fired by hidden Algerian insurgents. Shortly after, Captain Ysquierdo reported on the radio the following message: "Soleil est mort" meaning "the Sun (Jeanpierre) is dead". Pierre Jeanpierre died on 28 or 29 May 1958. Soon after his death, his Helicopter was also shot down by the Algerians. Although the trap was successful, and Jeanpierre did die, his paras later successfully sealed the breach caused by the ALN.

Citations 

This war chief "chef de guerre", a veteran of numerous conflicts, was feared in reason of his hard, harsh and demanding requirements in combat, sometimes passing the status of operations before the life of his legionnaires. Nevertheless, his legionnaires admired him since he always trained them, led and never asked them to conduct an act in which he would not lead the example first; the essence and corps of a Legion Officer's conduct becoming and leading even from the air followed by ground assaults. Legionnaires mainly and legion officers under his tasked orders and training, commanded a great deal of loyalty to Pierre.

His portrait is exposed amongst the most prestigious officers in the Legion in the honorary La Salle d'Honneur in the French Foreign Legion Museum at Aubagne.

In the annex of the report of the battle of the frontiers reserved exclusively for, regimental commander Colonel Buchond insists on:

<< the work of a single Commandant assisted by only one Captain and who only in one day mounts 4 para combat operations each time mounting at least a dozen of para combat companies, assists to 3 briefings in three different places, ensures the air sortie of 8 para air assaults, conducts 3 to 4 hours of flying in Alouette, moves his command post 3 times>>...

cited
<< this company Commandant is placed the 28th of April at 1000 by helicopter only 200 meters from the rebels, demolishes an entire section, brings back 3 automatic arms, is found engaged at 1800, embarked in vehicles at night, hits the road for 4 hours, is found at midnight at 20 km from there, engaged in combat till the morning, repacked at 0800, is engaged again at 1200 noon time after 4 hours truck drives, flown by helicopter at 1500 and is found 20 km from combat engaging two companies of rebels...>>

The author André Maurois rendered hommage and tribute with a couple of words:

"Un héros au cœur généreux et au caractère détestable, une assez bonne combinaison pour un chef "
<< a hero with a generous heart and a detestable character, a fairly good combination for a chief >>

Funeral 

The funeral of Pierre Paul Jeanpierre was the equivalent of a State Funeral with several honorific commemorative ceremonies. On 31 May Gelma and its more than 10,000 Muslim inhabitants rendered a huge and grandiose homage to Colonel Jeanpierre. From January to May, the legionnaires had lost 110 men, Jeanpierre was their 3rd. In 1959, the grande place of Zeralda, the garrison of the 1er REP and the chapel bore his name. All; local, foreign, senior French military and civilian authorities, specially, Para commanders, other military commanders, came all the way from France and elsewhere to pay their respects.

Honours and awards 

This soldier of Legend was injured twice in battle and is cited 9 times out of which 6 are at the orders of the armed forces, and several other awards not including:

Grand Officer of the Légion d'honneur
Croix de guerre 1939-1945 (3 citations)
Croix de guerre des Théatres d'Opérations Exterieures (5 citations)
Croix de la Valeur Militaire (3 citations)
Médaille de la Résistance avec rosette (Medal of the Resistance with Officer's Rosette)
Médaille coloniale
Médaille commémorative de la campagne d'Indochine
Médaille commémorative des opérations de sécurité et de maintien de l'ordre en Afrique du Nord

Legacy

Posthumous homages

École militaire interarmes ESM 

The 146th promotion of the École spéciale militaire de Saint-Cyr chose the promotion Lieutenant-Colonel Jeanpierre. The song of the promotion recalls the arms celebration of  lieutenant-colonel Jeanpierre.

Homages 
 The garrison and camp of the 1st Foreign Parachute Regiment carried his name in 1959.
 The grande place and chapel of Zéralda bears his hame in 1959.
 The "stage" 001 (1960) of academy officers of reserve in the Cherchell military academy bears his name.
 One of the Corniche prep classes of the Corniche Lyautey bears his name.
 A promotion EOR Infantry of St Cyr Coetquidan (Fev.Mars.Avril.Mai 1972) bears his name.
 A square in Nice bears his name in which a commemorative plaque has been erected. 
 An avenue in Cagnes-sur-Mer and the Le Cannet bears his name. 
 A roundabout in Aix-en-Provence bears his name.
 A road in Guelma, Algeria bears his name.
 A road in Nevers bears his name. 
 A road in Belfort bears his name.

References

1912 births
1958 deaths
Military personnel from Belfort
French Resistance members
French military personnel of World War II
French military personnel of the First Indochina War
French military personnel of the Suez Crisis
French military personnel of the Algerian War
Officers of the French Foreign Legion
Grand Officiers of the Légion d'honneur
Recipients of the Croix de Guerre 1939–1945 (France)
Recipients of the Croix de guerre des théâtres d'opérations extérieures
Recipients of the Resistance Medal
Recipients of the Cross for Military Valour
Mauthausen concentration camp survivors
French military personnel killed in the Algerian War